Basa may refer to:

Agreements
 Bilateral Aviation Safety Agreement, between National Aviation Authority regulators

People
 Basa (surname)
 Bassa people (Cameroon), also spelled Basa, an ethnic group
 Basa, leader and namesake of the Basingas, an Anglo-Saxon tribe

Languages
 Basaa language, also spelled Basa, a Bantu language spoken in Cameroon
 Basa languages, a cluster of Kainji languages spoken in Nigeria

Places
 Basa River, Romania
 Basa, Nepal, a village development committee
 Basa, Sudan, a village
 Basa Air Base, Floridablanca, Pampanga, Philippines

Organizations
 British Atomic Scientists Association, founded in 1946
 Black and Asian Studies Association, set up in London in 1991
 BASA Film, the Afghanistan cinema club

Other uses
 Basa (fish), a type of catfish
 Basa (cicada)

See also
 BASA-press (1992–2009), the oldest independent news agency in Moldova
 Bassa (disambiguation)
 Bhāṣā, the word for "language" in many Asian languages